Veryan Guy Henry Pappin (born 19 May 1958) is a former Scottish field hockey player, who was a member of the gold medal-winning Great Britain and Northern Ireland squad at the 1988 Summer Olympics in Seoul. Four years earlier, at the 1984 Summer Olympics in Los Angeles, the goalkeeper from Scotland secured the bronze medal with his team.

References

External links
 
 

1958 births
Living people
Scottish male field hockey players
Olympic field hockey players of Great Britain
British male field hockey players
Field hockey players at the 1984 Summer Olympics
Field hockey players at the 1988 Summer Olympics
Olympic gold medallists for Great Britain
Olympic bronze medallists for Great Britain
Olympic medalists in field hockey
Scottish Olympic medallists
Medalists at the 1988 Summer Olympics
Medalists at the 1984 Summer Olympics